Liberty Township is one of the twenty-two townships of Washington County, Ohio, United States.  The 2000 census found 621 people in the township.

Geography
Located in the northeastern part of the county, it borders the following townships:
Elk Township, Noble County - north
Bethel Township, Monroe County - northeast
Ludlow Township - east
Independence Township - southeast
Lawrence Township - south
Fearing Township - southwest corner
Salem Township - west

No municipalities are located in Liberty Township, although the unincorporated community of Germantown lies in the township's northeast.

Name and history
It is one of twenty-five Liberty Townships statewide.

Government
The township is governed by a three-member board of trustees, who are elected in November of odd-numbered years to a four-year term beginning on the following January 1. Two are elected in the year after the presidential election and one is elected in the year before it. There is also an elected township fiscal officer, who serves a four-year term beginning on April 1 of the year after the election, which is held in November of the year before the presidential election. Vacancies in the fiscal officership or on the board of trustees are filled by the remaining trustees.

References

External links
County website

Townships in Washington County, Ohio
Townships in Ohio